Agonopterix japonica is a moth in the family Depressariidae. It was described by Saito in 1980. It is found in Japan.

References

Moths described in 1980
Agonopterix
Moths of Japan